The Franciscan Sisters of Christ the King, formerly known as the Franciscan Sisters of Oregon, are an order of religious sisters founded by Fr. Eugene N. Heidt on February 2, 2000. It was established in the footsteps of Saint Francis with the aim of educating young people in accordance with traditional catholic values. The motherhouse and novitiate are located in Kansas City, Missouri. As of 2003, the Superior General is Mother Mary Joseph.

See also
 Traditional Catholicism
 List of Catholic religious institutes
 SSPX-affiliated religious orders
 Tridentine Mass

References

External links
 SSPX: Society of St. Pius X, U.S. District official website

Traditionalist Catholic nuns and religious sisters
Society of Saint Pius X
Christian religious orders established in the 21st century
Christian organizations established in 2000